Adraspalle is a village in Ranga Reddy district, in Telangana, India. The total population of Adraspalle is approximately 2000.

References

Villages in Ranga Reddy district